Uthai Thani Football Club is a Thai professional association football club based in Uthai Thani province. It was renamed in 2019, following Air Force United F.C.'s owner's decision to change the club's name and relocate to Uthai Thani. The club currently plays in Thai League 2.

Timeline
History of events of Uthai Thani Football Club

Crest history
The club changed its logo in 2020 due to the renaming from Air Force United.

Stadium and locations

Season-by-season record

Domestic
As Air Force United

League
 Thai League 1: 2 titles
1997, 1999

 Thai League 2: 1 titles
 2013

 Khǒr Royal Cup (Tier 2 when contested): 16 titles
1949-51, 1961, 1962, 1964, 1965, 1967, 1973, 1977, 1982, 1985–87, 1989, 1991

 Khor Royal Cup (Tier 5 when contested): 8 titles
1966, 1970, 1971, 1983, 1985–87, 1990

 Ngor Royal Cup (tier 6 when contested): 4 titles
1966, 1984, 1986, 1988

Cups
 Queen's Cup: 3 titles
1970, 1974, 1982

 FA Cup: 3 titles
1995, 1996, 2001

 League Cup: 2 titles
1987, 1994

 Kor Royal Cup: 12 titles
1952, 1953, 1957, 1958, 1959, 1960, 1961, 1962, 1963, 1967, 1987, 1996

As Uthai Thani

League
 Thai League 3: 1 titles
 2021–22

 Thai League 3 Northern Region: 1 titles
 2021–22

Club staff

Current squad

References

External links
 Website of Uthai Thani Forest F.C.
 Facebookpage of Uthai Thani F.C.

Football clubs in Thailand
Association football clubs established in 2010
2010 establishments in Thailand
Sport in Uthai Thani province